Julio Enrique Pichardo Ramos (born 10 January 1990) is a Cuban football goalkeeper.

Club career
Pichardo moved abroad to play for Antiguan side Five Islands alongside compatriots Sánder Fernández, Yoandir Puga, Armando Oramas and Yusvani Caballero.

International career
Pichardo made his international debut for Cuba in a June 2011 CONCACAF Gold Cup match against El Salvador and has earned a total of 2 caps, scoring no goals. His second cap was a November 2012 Caribbean Cup qualification match against Trinidad & Tobago.

References

External links
 

1990 births
Living people
Association football goalkeepers
Cuban footballers
Cuba international footballers
FC Las Tunas players
Five Islands F.C. players
2011 CONCACAF Gold Cup players
2013 CONCACAF Gold Cup players
Cuban expatriate footballers
Cuban expatriate sportspeople in Antigua and Barbuda
Expatriate footballers in Antigua and Barbuda
Antigua and Barbuda Premier Division players
People from Colombia, Cuba